Melonie Diaz (born April 25, 1984) is an American film and television actress who has appeared in many independent films, including four shown at the 2008 Sundance Film Festival. She received Independent Spirit Awards nominations for performances in films A Guide to Recognizing Your Saints (2006) and Fruitvale Station (2013). From 2018 to 2022, she appeared as the leading role of witch Mel Vera on the remake television series Charmed on The CW.

Early life
Diaz was born in New York City, and was raised along with her elder sister on the Lower East Side ("Loisaida" or Alphabet City, Manhattan), by parents of Puerto Rican descent. She became interested in acting at the Henry Street Settlement and subsequently attended the Professional Performing Arts School in Manhattan.
 
She completed a degree in Film Production at New York University's Tisch School of the Arts, and has made numerous off-Broadway and workshop appearances including Medea at Bullet Space, the Hip Hop Theater Festival at P.S. 122, and the New York City Fringe Festival.

Career

She started her film career with a supporting role in Tom DiCillo's Double Whammy (2001) and later landed roles in Jim McKay and Hannah Weyer's From an Objective Point of View and Peter Sollett's Raising Victor Vargas (both 2002). Television work at this time included an episode of Law & Order and a pilot for Queens Supreme (both 2003).

Her breakthrough roles came as Blanca in Catherine Hardwicke's Lords of Dogtown (2005) and as Laurie in Dito Montiel's A Guide to Recognizing Your Saints (2006) which earned her an Independent Spirit Awards nomination for Best Supporting Female. She was subsequently cast by Jamie Babbit in the lead role of Anna in Itty Bitty Titty Committee (2007) as well as a role in Hamlet 2, Be Kind Rewind, and also played Christina in American Son in 2008.

She appeared in the Mary J. Blige video "We Got Hood Love" which debuted on May 10, 2010.

In 2012, she starred in the indie romantic comedy, She Wants Me with Josh Gad and Kristen Ruhlin. In a hyped-up, Woody Allen, Annie Hall-type film, she plays a girl who gets caught in a love triangle between aspiring artists and a celebrity.

In 2013, she appeared in Fruitvale Station, a film based on the shooting of Oscar Grant. The film premiered at the 2013 Sundance Film Festival, where it earned the U.S. Grand Jury Prize: Dramatic and the Audience Award: U.S. Dramatic. The film had its international premiere at the 2013 Cannes Film Festival, where it played in the  section and won the  Best First Film award. For her work in the movie she was nominated for an Independent Spirit Award for Best Supporting Female.

She has expressed a desire to return to Tisch in order to complete her degree in filmmaking, citing director Kathryn Bigelow as an inspiration.

In 2014 she appeared briefly on an episode of Girls as Susan, a friend of Jessa Johansson's. That same year she appeared in Ryan Piers Williams' film X/Y alongside America Ferrera as well as The Cobbler starring Adam Sandler.

In February 2018, Diaz was cast in the lead role of Mel Vera in The CW's fantasy drama series Charmed, a reboot of the 1998 series of the same name. The reboot "centers on three sisters in a college town who discover they are witches".

Diaz co-starred in the dystopian thriller The First Purge, the prequel to 2013's The Purge and the fourth installment in The Purge franchise. The film was released July 4, 2018.

Personal life 

Diaz is married to actor Octavio Genera, having eloped during the COVID-19 pandemic. She announced her pregnancy with their first child in March of 2021.

Filmography

Films

Television

References

External links
 
 Diaz’s Top Indie Flicks

1984 births
Living people
American film actresses
Hispanic and Latino American actresses
American television actresses
American actresses of Puerto Rican descent
Actresses from New York City
Tisch School of the Arts alumni
21st-century American actresses